Geraldine Yesenia Cisneros Matos (born 12 March 1996) is a Peruvian footballer who plays as a midfielder for Club Universitario de Deportes and the Peru women's national team.

Cisneros represented Peru at the 2012 South American U-17 Women's Championship and two South American U-20 Women's Championship editions (2014 and 2015). At senior level, she played the 2014 Copa América Femenina.

References

1996 births
Living people
Women's association football midfielders
Peruvian women's footballers
Peru women's international footballers
Club Universitario de Deportes footballers